The San Diego Daily Journal was a daily newspaper in San Diego, California. It was published by Clinton D. McKinnon from 1944 to 1947, with short runs or a single issue in 1950. It was preceded by the San Diego Progress-Journal.

References
°

Defunct newspapers published in California
Newspapers published in San Diego
Publications established in 1944
Publications disestablished in 1950